Ty Franck (born May 18, 1969) is an American novelist, screenwriter, and television producer.  He is best known for co-authoring The Expanse with Daniel Abraham  under the pseudonym James S. A. Corey, as well as Game of Thrones: A Telltale Games Series (2014) and The Expanse: Expanded (2016).  The Expanse novels have been adapted into the television series The Expanse (2015–2022), with both Franck and Abraham serving as writers and producers on the show.

Franck wrote the Star Wars novel Honor Among Thieves (2014) with Abraham and used the pen name James S. A. Corey again. In addition to his own work, Franck has served as personal assistant to George R. R. Martin and has written for Martin's Wild Cards universe.

Leviathan Wakes, book one of The Expanse, was nominated for the 2012 Hugo Award for Best Novel, while The Expanse series was nominated in 2017 and again in 2020 where it won.

Career

The Expanse 
In 2011, Franck launched a new science fiction series, The Expanse, co-authored with Daniel Abraham  under the pseudonym James S.A. Corey. The books are based on a role-playing game set up by Franck, who had developed a science fiction universe that spanned the solar system. After Franck moved to New Mexico and became part of the science fiction writing community, he set up several campaigns of the game, one that included Abraham as a player. Abraham was impressed by the amount of research and world-building Franck had done and asked to write a novel set in the game's universe. Franck agreed and decided to split the proceeds of the book with Abraham for his part in writing from Franck's notes and outline. After reading Abraham's first chapters, Franck decided to become more involved with the writing. The pair collaborate on the overarching plot, meeting weekly to outline chapters, with Abraham focusing on structure and prose, and Franck developing the story and world. They alternate chapters, writing for different characters each, with Abraham writing Miller, Melba, Avasarala, Bull, and Prax, then swap and rewrite the other's work. By the end of the process, Abraham has stated it would be hard to identify which line was written by which author.
The first book, Leviathan Wakes, was published in June 2011 by Orbit, Abraham's publishing house for his fantasy series The Dagger and the Coin. The novel was nominated for the Hugo Award in 2012 and received acclaim from the science fiction community. A prequel short story titled "The Butcher of Anderson Station" was published in October 2011 and provides background to one of the secondary characters of Leviathan Wakes, Colonel Fred Johnson.

Its sequel, Caliban's War, was published in June 2012. The novel expanded the number of point of view characters from two to four, which according to Abraham, allowed for more freedom to explore the characters' situations. The novel was followed by a novella, Gods of Risk, published in September 2012. The story takes place between the second and third books of the series, and is set in the same time period as the main novels but follows a separate story-line. A second prequel short story, "Drive", was published in the anthology Edge of Infinity in November 2012, set decades before the first novel.

The third book, Abaddon's Gate, was released in June 2013, and won the Locus Award for Best Science Fiction Novel. A second prequel novella, The Churn, was published in April 2014 and features the main series character Amos Burton.

The fourth book, Cibola Burn, was published in June 2014, the first novel in the series to be released in hardcover.  The fifth book, Nemesis Games, was released in June 2015, and was praised by Andrew Liptak of io9 as "Corey's Empire Strikes Back." It was followed by the novella The Vital Abyss in October 2015.

The sixth book, Babylon's Ashes, was released in December 2016; and the seventh, Persepolis Rising, in December 2017. There are a total of nine novels and five novellas planned for the series, with the last book expected to be released in late 2021.

Published works

The Expanse series
The Expanse space opera novels are written by Abraham and Ty Franck under the joint pseudonym James S. A. Corey.
 Leviathan Wakes (June 15, 2011)
 Caliban's War (June 26, 2012)
 Abaddon's Gate (June 4, 2013)
 Cibola Burn (June 5, 2014)
 Nemesis Games (June 2, 2015)
 Babylon's Ashes (December 6, 2016)
 Persepolis Rising (December 5, 2017)
 Tiamat's Wrath (March 26, 2019)
 Leviathan Falls (November 30, 2021)

Related works 
 "The Butcher of Anderson Station" (The Expanse short story) (2011)
 Gods of Risk (The Expanse novella) (2012)
 "Drive" (The Expanse short story) (2012)
 The Churn (The Expanse novella) (2014)
 The Vital Abyss (The Expanse novella) (2015)
 Strange Dogs (The Expanse novella) (2017)
 Auberon (The Expanse novella) (2019)

Other novels
 Honor Among Thieves (with Daniel Abraham as James S. A. Corey) (Star Wars: Empire and Rebellion, book 2) (2014)

Collections 
 Leviathan Wept and Other Stories (May 31, 2010)

References

External links

Ty Franck at Fantasy Literature
The Internet Speculative Fiction Database

1969 births
21st-century American male writers
21st-century American novelists
21st-century American short story writers
American comics writers
American fantasy writers
American male novelists
American male short story writers
American science fiction writers
Hugo Award-winning writers
Living people
Writers from New Mexico
Writers from Oregon
Weird fiction writers